Bool may refer to:

People
Al Bool (1897–1981), American baseball player
Henry Bool (1846–1922), American anarchist

Places
Bool (Ludhiana East), a village in Punjab, India
Bool, Tagbilaran, a barangay (suburb) in the Philippines
Bool Island, Sulawesi, Indonesia
Bool Lagoon, a freshwater lagoon in South Australia
Bool Lagoon Game Reserve, a protected area in South Australia
Bool Lagoon, South Australia, a locality
Mount Bool, Antarctica

Computer programming
 Boolean data type in computer programming

See also
Boole (disambiguation)
Boul (disambiguation)
Boule (disambiguation)